Bungonia is a small town in the Southern Tablelands in New South Wales,  Australia in Goulburn Mulwaree. The name of the town derives from an Aboriginal word meaning 'sandy creek'.

History

Bungonia was originally called Inverary until it was renamed in 1836. Inverary was the name of the Post Office which was established as the town was starting to form in 1832.

When the Great South Road (now the Hume Highway) bypassed the town, Bungonia ceased to grow beyond a very small village.

Heritage listings
Bungonia has a number of heritage-listed sites, including:
 Christ Church Anglican Church
 Caarne Historic Site
 Inverary Park
 Long Gully Mining Area
 Lumley Park Homestead
 Spring Creek Bungonia Historic Area

Local school 

The local area school is the Windellama Public School.

Notable people 

 Anne Wiggan - Rewarded with the Order of Australia Medal for contribution to Bungonia and Goulburn Communities

See also
 Bungonia Caves
 Bungonia State Recreation Area

References

 Exploring the ACT and Southeast New South Wales, J. Kay McDonald, Kangaroo Press, Sydney, 1985

External links
  Bungonia National Park
  Bungonia Village

Goulburn Mulwaree Council
Southern Tablelands